Sacred Heart Public School is a former school facility in Sacred Heart, Minnesota, United States.  The original building was constructed in 1901 and expanded in 1929, 1953, 1964, and 1974.  It was listed on the National Register of Historic Places in 2014 for having local significance in education, entertainment/recreation, and social history.  Its construction history reflects the 20th-century growth and educational expansion of small-town public schools, while its 1929 auditorium/gymnasium also served as Sacred Heart's primary venue for public functions.  The school closed in 2009, though the building is still used for local events.

See also
 National Register of Historic Places listings in Renville County, Minnesota

References

1901 establishments in Minnesota
2009 disestablishments in Minnesota
Buildings and structures in Renville County, Minnesota
Education in Renville County, Minnesota
Colonial Revival architecture in Minnesota
Defunct schools in Minnesota
National Register of Historic Places in Renville County, Minnesota
Public elementary schools in Minnesota
School buildings completed in 1901
School buildings on the National Register of Historic Places in Minnesota